2002 was the first season of the Russian Premier League. While the structure of the competition did not change, the top level clubs gained independence from the Professional Football League.

Spartak's six-year dominance in the league was broken by Lokomotiv.

Teams 
As in the previous season, 16 teams are playing in the 2002 season, with the name of the league changing from the 'Top Division' to the 'Premier League'. After the 2001 season, Fakel Voronezh and Chernomorets Novorossiysk were relegated to the 2002 Russian First Division. They were replaced by Uralan Elista and Shinnik Yaroslavl, the winners and runners up of the 2001 Russian First Division.

Venues

Personnel and kits

Managerial changes

Standings 

As CSKA and Lokomotiv finished at the top of the table with equal points, the title was decided in a championship play-off.

Torpedo qualified for the UEFA Cup thanks to Spartak winning the Russian Cup in 2003.

Results

Season statistics

Top goalscorers

Awards 
On December 10 Russian Football Union named its list of 33 top players:

Goalkeepers
  Sergei Ovchinnikov (Lokomotiv Moscow)
  Ruslan Nigmatullin (CSKA Moscow)
  Valeri Chizhov (Saturn)

Sweeper
  Sergei Ignashevich (Lokomotiv Moscow)
  Sargis Hovsepyan (Zenit)
  Bohdan Shershun (CSKA Moscow)

Right backs
  Vadim Evseev (Lokomotiv Moscow)
  Dmytro Parfenov (Spartak Moscow)
  Dmitri Sennikov (Lokomotiv Moscow)

Stopper
  Gennadiy Nizhegorodov (Lokomotiv Moscow)
  Oleg Pashinin (Lokomotiv Moscow)
  Omari Tetradze (Alania)

Left backs
  Jacob Lekgetho (Lokomotiv Moscow)
  Ibra Kébé (Spartak Moscow)
  Denis Yevsikov (CSKA Moscow)

Defensive midfielders
  Elvir Rahimić (CSKA Moscow)
  Yevgeni Aldonin (Rotor)
  Igor Semshov (Torpedo Moscow)

Right wingers
  Rolan Gusev (CSKA Moscow)
  Andrei Arshavin (Zenit)
  Ognjen Koroman (Dynamo Moscow)

Central midfielders
  Dmitri Loskov (Lokomotiv Moscow)
  Vladimir Maminov (Lokomotiv Moscow)
  Yegor Titov (Spartak Moscow)

Left wingers
  Andrei Karyaka (Krylia Sovetov)
  Andrei Solomatin (CSKA Moscow)
  Igor Yanovsky (CSKA Moscow)

Right forwards
  Sergei Semak (CSKA Moscow)
  James Obiorah (Lokomotiv Moscow)
  Dmitri Kirichenko (CSKA Moscow)

Left forwards
  Aleksandr Kerzhakov (Zenit)
  Ruslan Pimenov (Lokomotiv Moscow)
  Denis Popov (CSKA Moscow)

Medal squads

See also 
2002 in Russian football

References

External links 
 RSSSF

2002
1
Russia
Russia